Duga Poljana is a village located in the municipality of Sjenica, Serbia. According to the 2011 census, the village has a population of 594 inhabitants.

References

Populated places in Zlatibor District